Valuev or Valuyev is a Russian surname. Notable people with the surname include:

Grigory Valuyev (? - after 1623), Russian voyevoda
Nikolai Valuev (born 1973), Russian boxer and member of the State Duma
Pyotr Valuev (1815–1890), Russian statesman and writer

See also
Valuev Circular, a secret decree which stopped all publications in Ukrainian language

Russian-language surnames